Creston station is an Amtrak intercity train station in Creston, Iowa. The station is served by the Chicago–San Francisco Bay Area California Zephyr. Constructed by the Chicago, Burlington and Quincy Railroad (CB&Q) and opened in 1899, the station is listed on the National Register of Historic Places as the  Chicago, Burlington and Quincy Railroad-Creston Station. Amtrak moved to the historic station in 2019 from a small station immediately to its east that had been used since 1969. Creston station is also used by the city of Creston as a city hall and community center, known as the Creston Municipal Complex.

History

The station was built by the Chicago, Burlington and Quincy Railroad (CB&Q) in 1899 for $75,000. The Chicago architectural firm of Burnham and Root, who designed many of the CB&Q's stations, designed this station as well. Creston was a division headquarters, therefore all of the railroad's business in southwest Iowa operated from here. It also housed the office of the Master Carpenter, who oversaw all section and bridge work for the division, and the office of the trainmaster, who oversaw the switching and forming of trains in the Creston yards.  In addition to the CB&Q mainline, two branch lines originated from here, and another railroad operated from the depot as well. Creston also had various maintenance shops and contained a roundhouse; both have since been demolished or destroyed by a tornado.

Passenger rail service in the United States heavily declined in the 1960s, and the large Creston station was deemed too expensive to maintain. In 1969, the CB&Q built a small brick and steel depot to the east of the original station. This was later used by Amtrak after its creation in 1971. The original station was sold to the city of Creston for $1. The future of the station was seen in limbo, and the mayor of Creston noted in 1970 that the area would be a good site for a parking lot. Local residents launched a "Save the Depot Committee" and gathered 700 letters of support for saving the depot. The building was also listed on the National Register of Historic Places in 1973. Renovations were completed in December 1978, and the building houses various community rooms on the first floor and city government on the second floor.

Amtrak service was restored to the historic station on August 1, 2019. Amtrak signed a 20-year lease with the city of Creston in 2017. Work was performed by Amtrak to make the waiting room ADA-accessible. The nearby platforms of the 1969-station are still in use to board trains.

References

External links

Creston Amtrak Stations (USA RailGuide – TrainWeb)

Railway stations in the United States opened in 1899
Railway stations in the United States opened in 1969
Creston, Iowa
City and town halls in Iowa
Transportation buildings and structures in Union County, Iowa
Railway stations on the National Register of Historic Places in Iowa
Amtrak stations in Iowa
Former Chicago, Burlington and Quincy Railroad stations
National Register of Historic Places in Union County, Iowa
1899 establishments in Iowa
Railway stations in the United States opened in 2019